Wayne County Airport  is a public airport located six miles (10 km) northeast of the central business district of Wooster, a city in Wayne County, Ohio, United States. It is owned by Wayne County. Prior to its construction sometime after 1972, the city of Wooster was served by Wooster Municipal Airport 3 miles southwest of the current Wayne County Airport.

Facilities and aircraft 

For the 12-month period ending August 26, 2016, the airport had 66,000 aircraft operations, an average of 181 per day: 83% general aviation, 15% air taxi and 2% military. In March 2017, there were 43 aircraft based at this airport: 30 single-engine, 3 multi-engine, 6 jet and 4 helicopter.

Accidents and Incidents 
In January 2020, a software bug was discovered that would cause some Boeing 737 Next Generation Glass cockpit screens to blank when attempting to land at this airport.

References

External links 

Official Wooster Wayne County Airport Site KBJJ

Airports in Ohio
Buildings and structures in Wayne County, Ohio
Transportation in Wayne County, Ohio